Miophocaena nishinoi is an extinct species of porpoise from the Late Miocene Koetoi Formation of Japan, dating to around 6.4–5.5 million years ago (mya), represented by a partial skull. the genus name derives from Ancient Greek mio for the Miocene, and phocaena for "porpoise"; the species name honors the discoverer, Takanobu Nishino. Miophocaena resides in a clade with Archaeophocaena discovered in the same area, and, along with Pterophocaena, represents an intermediate phase between porpoises and dolphins.

References

Porpoises
Mammals described in 2012
Pliocene mammals of Asia